Thalía | Greatest Hits is a compilation album by Mexican pop star Thalía. Released on February 10, 2004, the album features 14 singles from her five previous albums of original material for EMI Latin (it does not include any material from before 1995, nor from her various remake and remix albums), plus two previously unreleased songs "Acción y Reacción" & "Cuando Tu Me Tocas". All of the songs appear in Spanish, including those originally released in English. In April and May 2004, Thalía toured the United States and Mexico on her High Voltage Tour. This marked the first time Thalía toured the US.

Background and production
Greatest Hits is the first compilation of songs from Thalía's EMI catalog. Previously, in 1994, the singer released her first compilation of hits entitled Los Deseos De Thalia (Grandes Exitos) which included tracks from her first three albums: Thalía, Mundo de Cristal and Love, the collection was promoted on TV through commercials and ended Thalía's contract with Fonovisa. Since Los Deseos de Thalía, several other collections with songs from the singer's first three albums were released. The album Greatest Hits includes songs from En éxtasis, Amor a la Mexicana, Arrasando, Thalía and Thalía. It also includes the theme of Thalía's soap opera María la del Barrio and  plus two previously unreleased songs "Acción y Reacción" and "Cuando Tu Me Tocas". All of the songs appear in Spanish, including those originally released in English.

The album was released in three formats a Walmart's exclusive CD + DVD which includes 10 tracks plus 10 music videos and multimedia gallery, a standard CD with 16 tracks and DVD that features a grand total of sixteen videos, such as "Gracias a Dios", "Amor a la Mexicana", "Entre el Mar y una Estrella", "Tú y Yo", and "¿A Quién le Importa?". The DVD does not contain all of Thalía's videos, leaving out videos such as: "Viaje Tiempo Atrás", "Mujer Latina (European Version)" and all her videos from the first three albums, released by Fonovisa. In the United States the album came with 4 bonus videos.

The singer stressed that delivering a greatest hits album to the public is important: "For me it is very important to give this to the public, because the last ten or fifteen years of my musical history is a story that we have both built, and they have given me the opportunity to have a space and a place in the world of music. entertainment".

Singles
"Acción y reacción": The song was previously unreleased, written by Estéfano and Julio Reyes and produced by Estéfano. This track was recorded during the Thalía Sessions, but didn't make it. So the unfinished demo was leaked in May 2002, and it had good reactions in the fans, Thalia decided this track should be re-recorded and re-arranged. The mastered version became included on the Greatest Hits album. This song talks about Thalía and Tommy Mottola's relationship. The music video contains footage from Thalía's "High Voltage Tour" in the United States and Mexico. It mixes images of her performances and of her fans when they were waiting in the concert's queues. The video was officially released by the TV Magazine Primer Impacto.

Critical reception

The album was well received by music critics. Jason Birchmeier from AllMusic website wrote that the album is "a well-balanced sample of the Latin pop star's many hits from the mid-'90s to the early 2000s" and "a great beginning-to-end listen -- again, a nonstop pleasure as the joyful, feel-good parade of hits cascades over the course of the hour-plus CD." He also gave four and a half stars for both album and DVD. About the selection of videos of the DVD he wrote that "Given her big budget, unmatched charisma, acting prowess, and knockdown-gorgeous beauty, these are very appealing videos by any standard" and that the consumer should prefer the DVD version rather than the hybrid CD/DVD. In his review for DVD Movie Guide Colin Jacobson wrote that "despite some misfires, Thalia’s Greatest Hits offers a pretty nice collection" and that "the package still tosses in a lot of solid stuff, and the videos mostly work well". He criticized the lack of extras and the absent of "some pre-EMI material" and conclude that "because it doesn’t include material from her entire career, Thalia’s Greatest Hits doesn’t present a completely satisfying package."

Chart performance
The album debut at #2 in the Billboard Top Latin Albums on 28 February 2004. In the United States the album sold 50,000 copies after one month of its release, according to Nielsen SoundScan. In Mexico the album was certified gold. The DVD was certified Gold in Mexico and Platinum in Argentina.

Track listing

Charts

Weekly charts

Year-end charts

Certifications and sales

!colspan=3|Album
|-

!colspan=3|Video
|-

References

External links 
 Buy It: Amazon.com
 Thalia: Greatest Hits (VIDEOS) DVD
 Thalia: Greatest Hits (Japan Import)
 Thalia: Greatest Hits CD
 Thalia:Greatest Hits CD+DVD

2004 greatest hits albums
Thalía compilation albums
Spanish-language albums
Music video compilation albums
2004 video albums
EMI Latin compilation albums
Thalía video albums